Canvas Bags may refer to:

 Bags made of canvas
 Canvas bags, a controversial gimmick used in the marketing of Fallout 76
 "Canvas Bags", a 2006 song from the album So Rock by Australian musical comedian Tim Minchin